Darren Lok Yee Deng (born 18 September 1991) is an English-born Malaysian professional footballer who plays as a striker for Malaysia Super League side Sabah and the Malaysian national team.

Early life
Born in Hailsham, East Sussex, Lok is of Chinese Malaysian and English descent. His father is from Tengkera in Malacca.

Club career

Eastbourne Borough 

Lok began his career with the Eastbourne Borough Academy. Later, he was promoted to the senior squad in 2012. Darren Lok was working shifts in an NHS psychiatric hospital as a psychiatric support worker in the south of England while also playing part-time football for Eastbourne Borough of the National League South, the sixth tier overall of the English football league system. At the start of the 2012–13 season, he was loaned to Horsham. He impressed at Horsham, but was recalled by Eastbourne after 2 games, due to a player shortage at the club.

Early in his Borough career, Lok gained a reputation as a 'super-sub' due to the late goals he would score after coming off the bench.

Johor Darul Ta'zim

At the end of the 2015-16 season, Lok left Eastbourne to sign for Johor Darul Ta'zim II of the Malaysia Premier League. His registration was delayed, due to having to apply for a Malaysian passport. In September 2016 he received his Malaysian passport, which enabled him to play for JDT II as well as the Malaysia national football team. Darren Lok only managed to appear twice for the JDT II Team before the season ended.

For the 2017 Malaysia Super League, JDT Coach Mario Gómez announced that Lok would be promoted to the JDT first team from JDT II for the upcoming 2017 season.

Terengganu FC 
In January 2020, Terengganu FC has signed Lok to be with the team for the Malaysia League 2020 season. He only managed to make 4 league appearances for the team.

Petaling Jaya City FC 
Petaling Jaya City FC announced the signing of Lok from Terengganu FC in December 2020. He cited a lack of playing time as one of the reasons for his decision to join PJ City FC after a one-year stint with Terengganu FC.

International career

Born in England, Lok was eligible for Malaysia through his father.

Lok made his Malaysian national football team debut against Singapore in 2016 and scored his first international goal against Syria in 2017. Lok was also part of the Malaysian team that qualified for the 2023 Asian Cup and scored the fourth goal in their last qualifier, his second international goal.

Career statistics

Club

International

International goals
Scores and results list Malaysia's goal tally first.

Honours
Johor Darul Ta'zim
 Malaysia Cup: 2017
 Malaysia Super League : 2017, 2018

Johor Darul Ta'zim II
 Malaysia Challenge Cup: 2019

International
King's Cup runner-up: 2022

References

External links
 

1991 births
Living people
Malaysian footballers
Malaysian expatriate footballers
People from Hailsham
English people of Malaysian descent
British people of Malaysian descent
Eastbourne Borough F.C. players
Johor Darul Ta'zim F.C. players
Terengganu FC players
Terengganu F.C. II players
Petaling Jaya City FC players
Sabah F.C. (Malaysia) players
Malaysia Super League players
Malaysia Premier League players
Malaysia international footballers
English footballers
Association football forwards
British emigrants to Malaysia
People who lost British citizenship
Citizens of Malaysia through descent
Malaysian sportspeople of Chinese descent